Hazar is a Turkish unisex given name and it is a Turkic tribe's name who lived around the Caspian Sea between the 7th and 11th centuries.

Given name
Hazar Ergüçlü

References

Turkish given names